Hugo Alexandre Esteves Costa (born 4 November 1973) is a Portuguese former professional footballer who played as a central defender.

Club career
Costa was born in Tramagal, Santarém District. A graduate of S.L. Benfica's youth system, he never appeared however for its first team, going on to spend the following four seasons in the Primeira Liga with Gil Vicente FC, S.C. Beira-Mar and C.F. Estrela da Amadora, being relegated with the second club in 1994–95.

In summer 1996, Costa signed with Stoke City of the English Football League Second Division. He left the Potters after only a couple of weeks and games, returning to his country with F.C. Alverca and remaining five seasons with the Lisbon outskirts side, three spent in the top flight.

From 2001 to 2003, also as first choice and in the main division, Costa played with Vitória de Setúbal. Subsequently, he joined Germany's Rot-Weiß Oberhausen (2. Bundesliga), staying two years in the country and suffering relegation in his second.

Costa returned to Portugal midway through the 2005–06 campaign and signed a six-month contract with U.D. Leiria, playing only 16 matches in the top tier over a three-year spell; 12 of those came in 2007–08, with the team ranking 16th and last. Afterwards, the 34-year-old moved to Cyprus with Atromitos Yeroskipou.

One year later, Costa once again returned to his homeland, agreeing to a deal at lowly C.D. Pinhalnovense. He left in 2011 aged nearly 38 and retired shortly after, subsequently working as a manager in amateur football.

Career statistics

References

External links

1973 births
Living people
Sportspeople from Santarém District
Portuguese footballers
Association football defenders
Primeira Liga players
Liga Portugal 2 players
Segunda Divisão players
Gil Vicente F.C. players
S.C. Beira-Mar players
C.F. Estrela da Amadora players
F.C. Alverca players
Vitória F.C. players
U.D. Leiria players
C.D. Pinhalnovense players
English Football League players
Stoke City F.C. players
2. Bundesliga players
Rot-Weiß Oberhausen players
Cypriot First Division players
Atromitos Yeroskipou players
Portugal youth international footballers
Portugal under-21 international footballers
Portuguese expatriate footballers
Expatriate footballers in England
Expatriate footballers in Germany
Expatriate footballers in Cyprus
Portuguese expatriate sportspeople in England
Portuguese expatriate sportspeople in Germany
Portuguese expatriate sportspeople in Cyprus
Portuguese football managers